Lesley Woods (August 22, 1910 – August 2, 2003) was an American radio, stage and television actress. She was a graduate of the Goodman School of Drama in Chicago.

Personal life
Woods was married to actor Richard McMurray. Sam McMurray is her stepson.

Death
Woods died on August 2, 2003, 20 days before her 93rd birthday.

Stage
Woods' acting on Broadway included being in Double Dummy (1936), Excursion (1937), Comes the Revelation (1942), The Assassin (1945), and A Case of Libel (1963–64). She was a member of Theatre West. A Billboard review of Comes the Revelation summarized Woods' acting as follows: "Small, blond and attractive, Miss Woods plays with an honesty and restraint that are as rare as they are commendable. Quiet, sincere and tremendously effective, she does one of the finest jobs of the entire season."

Radio
Woods' roles on radio programs included those shown in the table below.

Other programs on which Woods was a regular included Crime and Peter Chambers, Inner Sanctum Mystery, The Private Files of Rex Saunders, Treasury Star Parade, and It Can Be Done.

Television
A veteran of at least 10 daytime serials, Woods' daytime debut was as Claire Bannister Steele on Young Dr. Malone from 1959-1963 as the serial's leading villainess.  Following that, she appeared on The Edge of Night as Evelyn Dark (1964), A Flame in the Wind as Miriam Bentley (1964–66), The Nurses (where she starred with McMurray) as Vivian Gentry (1965-1967), Search for Tomorrow as the original Andrea Whiting (1967), Bright Promise as Isabel Jones (1971-1972), Return to Peyton Place as Zoe Tate (1972-1973), and Days of Our Lives as Dorothy Kelly (1978).  On General Hospital, she played the role of Edna Hadley (1977-1978, 1980), the New York landlady who arranged for Heather Grant to sell her baby, Steven Lars. She guest-starred in an episode of Gibbsville in 1976, originated the role of Amanda Ewing, Jock's first wife, on Dallas, and had a recurring role as Chase Gioberti's housekeeper, Mrs. Miller, on Falcon Crest (1984-1987). She played Langley Wallingford's first wife, Betty Miller (Hilary's mother) on All My Children in 1984, and was part of the original cast of The Bold and the Beautiful as Helen Logan from 1987 to 1989, and again in 2001, when her character was a great-great-grandmother.

Television appearances

References

External links
 

1910 births
2003 deaths
American stage actresses
American television actresses
American radio actresses
American film actresses
20th-century American actresses
21st-century American women